Tore Elias Hoel (born 14 December 1953 in Harstad, Norway) is a Norwegian poet, author and children's author.

Bibliography 
 1979 – Å fange en hval (poems)
 1981 – Presidentens ro (poems)
 1988 – Verdsmeisteren (novel)
 1991 – Eg heiter Pawel (novel)
 1999 – Fire dagar i Nairobi (novel)
 2003 – Glaskula (novel)
 2005 – Vinterfilm (novel)
   2005   – Jomfru Rosenving på Santavajasø (libretto for Children's opera)
 2007 – To gutar til Paris (novel)

External links 
 Tore Elias Hoel at NRK Authors

Living people
1953 births
Norwegian writers
People from Harstad